LGA 1150, also known as Socket H3, is a zero insertion force flip-chip land grid array (LGA) CPU socket designed by Intel for CPUs built on the Haswell microarchitecture. This socket is also used by the Haswell's successor, Broadwell microarchitecture.

It is the successor of LGA 1155 and was itself succeeded by LGA 1151 in 2015.

Most motherboards with the LGA 1150 socket support varying video outputs (VGA, DVI or HDMI depending on the model) and Intel Clear Video Technology.

Full support of Windows on LGA 1150 platform starts on Windows 7 - official Windows XP support is limited to selected CPUs, chipsets and only for embedded and industrial systems.

Intel's Platform Controller Hub (PCH) for the LGA 1150 CPUs is codenamed Lynx Point.  Intel Xeon processors for socket LGA 1150 use the Intel C222, C224, and C226 chipsets.

Heatsink 
The 4 holes for fastening the heatsink to the motherboard are placed in a square with a lateral length of 75 mm for Intel's sockets LGA 1156, LGA 1155, LGA 1150, LGA 1151 and LGA 1200. Cooling solutions should therefore be interchangeable.

Haswell chipsets

First generation

Second generation 
On May 12, 2014, Intel announced the release of two 9-series chipsets, H97 and Z97.  Differences and new features of these two chipsets, compared to their H87 and Z87 counterparts, are the following:

 Support for Haswell Refresh CPUs out of the box
 Support for the fifth generation of Intel Core CPUs, built around the Broadwell microarchitecture
 Support for SATA Express, M.2 and Thunderbolt, though only if implemented by the motherboard's manufacturer
 Two of the six SATA ports can be converted to two PCIe lanes and used to provide M.2 or SATA Express connectivity.  Intel refers to this variable configuration as Flex I/O or Flexible I/O.

Motherboards based on H97 and Z97 chipsets were available for purchase the same day chipsets were announced.

See also 
 List of Intel chipsets
 List of Intel microprocessors

Notes

References 

Intel CPU sockets